Sin Parar or Sem Parar (Non Stop in English) is a line of candy bars and ice cream made by Nestlé. They are available in Peru, Mexico and Brazil (Sem Parar). They are targeted towards teenagers.

References
Elisabeth Malkin, "Mexican Marketers Have Youth Fever (int'l edition)", BusinessWeek Online : February 28, 2000 Issue

Chocolate bars
Ice cream brands
Nestlé brands